The Odisha Solar Conference (OSC) is a conference, the gathering of professionals to develop and promote solar power across Odisha.  TiE (The Indus Entrepreneur), Bhubaneswar Chapter and Canyon Consultancy together organizes the Odisha Solar Conference every year to promote and create awareness amongst the local investors about the benefits from the solar industry. The conference is held every year in association with Odisha Electricity Regulatory Commission (OERC), Industrial Promotion & Investment Corporation of Odisha Limited (IPICOL), Grid Corporation of Odisha (GRIDCO) and supported by Ministry of New and Renewable Energy.

History
The Odisha Solar Conference have completed its three editions in 2012, 2013, and 2014.

Conference dates

Odisha Solar Conference 2012

Organisers
The Organisers of the Odisha Solar Conference 2012 were Canyon Con, SEMI India & TiE Bhubaneswar.

Knowledge Partner

SEMI India was the Knowledge Partner for the Odisha Solar Conference 2012.

Sessions
Session I: Government Facilitation, Regulatory & Finance
Session II: Recruitment Process Outsourcing (RPO), REC, Solar Roof Top & Off Grid
Session III: Warp Up & Interactive Session

Odisha Solar Conference 2013

Organisers
The Organisers of the Odisha Solar Conference 2013 were Canyon Consultancy, SEMI India & TiE Bhubaneswar.

Knowledge Partner

SEMI India was the Knowledge Partner for the Odisha Solar Conference 2013.

Sessions
Session I: Solar Policy, RPO, REC & Hybrid Projects
National Solar Mission and State Solar Policies 
Renewable Purchase Obligation (RPO) & Renewable Energy Certificate (REC) Mechanism 
Biomass Solar Hybrid Projects
Session II: Solar Thermal & Roof-top Solar PV
Solar Termal and Roof Top Solar PV 
MW Scale Solar Roof-top Project in Twin City (Bhubaneswar-Cuttack) 
Molten Salt based 24X7 Solar Thermal Project 
Case Study of MW Scale Roof Top Solar in Gandhinagar 
Case Study of 2.5kWp Roof Top Project in BJB Nagar, Bhubaneswar - Net Meter 
Session III: Solar Funding, Rural Electrification & CSR
Solar Funding from National Agencies and International Bi-Lateral Agencies 
Remote Area Electrification through Solar 
Green CSR (Corporate Social Responsibility) – Solar 
Case Study of  a Model Solar Village

Odisha Solar Conference 2014

Organisers
The Organisers of the Odisha Solar Conference 2014 were Canyon Consultancy, SEMI India & TiE Bhubaneswar.

Knowledge Partner

SEMI India was the Knowledge Partner for the Odisha Solar Conference 2014.

Sessions
Session I: Solar Policy & Ultra Mega Solar Project
Session II: Experience Of Agencies & Investors
Session III: Potential of Solar Roof Top & Off Grid

References

External links
 Official Website of Odisha Solar Conference

Economy of Odisha
2012 conferences
2013 conferences
2014 conferences
Energy conferences
Technology conferences
Business conferences in India
Solar power in India